Zara Nachke Dikha (English: Show Me Your Dance) is an Indian dance reality show originally aired on STAR One but then aired on STAR Plus. The series debuted on 14 July 2008 and was hosted by Karan Singh Grover and Shweta Gulati. All the contestants have a film or television background. The next season aired two years later on 1 May 2010 in India and United States. Consequent episodes are aired Saturday and Sunday evenings.

The show features a variety of Indian cultural and international dance styles ranging across a broad spectrum of classical, contemporary, Bollywood, hip-hop, Break dance jazz, Kalaripayattu, Salsa, Samba and musical theatre styles, amongst others, with many subgenres within these categories represented apart from these dance styles the contestants have performed various extremely dangerous acts such as playing with fire, burning themselves, dance with fire, dancing in the water, breaking glasses with their bodies, etc. and have performed really difficult dance styles such as Shadow Dance, Krumping, Ballet, Tap dancing, Belly dance, etc. Competitors attempt to master these styles in an attempt to survive successive weeks of elimination and win a cash prize (typically Rs 50 Lakh) and often other awards. The show is judged by some of the most popular Indian choreographers and actors, such as Malaika Arora Khan and Chunkey Pandey in the first season and Shilpa Shetty Kundra, Arshad Warsi and Vaibhavi Merchant in the second season.

Concept

The program is a reality dance competition show.

Season 1
The theme of the show is 'The Battle of the Sexes', wherein two teams, the Tez Talwar boys and the Meethi Churi girls compete in a dance competition. Every weekend, there are five rounds, in which the contestants dance it out either solo or in groups. Depending on their performance, they receive points from the two judges. The team with the highest points at the end of a week's wins and gives a dance form to another team and they have to perform the dance form in the khallas round and impress the judges and if the judges are not impressed they are sent to a penalty chair where they cannot perform until their team wins and bring them back. They even have 3 lifelines to bring their contestants back if after one week is over of theirs on penalty bench.

Season 2
The theme of the show is 'The Battle of the Sexes', wherein two teams, the Mast Kalandar boys and the Massakali girls compete in a dance competition. Unlike the first season this season has eliminations. Every weekend, there are five rounds, in which the contestants dance it out either solo or in groups. Depending on their performance, they receive points from the three judges. The team with the highest points at the end of a week's episodes gets to nominate one contestant from their opponents' team for elimination. This contestant gets an opportunity to save him/her self from elimination in the next episode by impressing the judges with their performance.

Rounds

Season 1

 Tashan: solo dance with a prop
 HumTum: One Boy and one Girl dance together as a couple.
 Jhoom Barabar Jhoom: Group dance with a theme
 Zara Hatke: Two or more contestants from each team perform something different and innovative.
 Khallas: solo performance and if they lose they are sent to the penalty chair and they cannot perform until another Meethi Churi or Tez Talwar wins the round and bring their teammate back. They even have lifeline to bring their teammates back if a week is over of theirs on the penalty bench. The dance style performed in this round is given by the winning team.
 Lagi Bet: Both team bet unlimited points on their contestants and if they win its added and if they lose the bet points gets subtracted from their total score.

Season 2

 Khallas: Solo dance with a prop and a Mast Kalandar boys anda Massakali girls compete together against each other.
 Deo Spirit (duet): One Boy and one Girl dance together as a couple.
 De Dana Dan: Group dance with a theme.
 Takkar: Solo dance with a theme.
 Zara Hatke: Two or more contestants from each team perform something different and dangerous and the judges mark them out of 20.
 Baazigar (elimination round): Each week one contestant from the losing team is targeted to perform a solo dance and impress the Judges and if the judges get impressed they show a flag and if they are not impressed the contestant gets eliminated.
 Judge's Choice: Dance where one of the judges chooses the dance style

Seasons

Judges

Season 1

 Malaika Arora Khan
 Chunkey Pandey

Season 2

 Shilpa Shetty Kundra
 Arshad Warsi
 Vaibhavi Merchant

Hosts

Season 1

 Karan Singh Grover  / Shweta Gulati

Season 2

 Mohit Sehgal / Sanaya Irani - hosts for two episodes.
 RJ Mantra / Jennifer Winget - hosts.

Season 1 of Zara Nachke Dikha

Season 2 of Zara Nachke Dikha

References

External links

Official Site on STAR Plus

Dance competition television shows
StarPlus original programming
Indian reality television series
Indian dance television shows
2010 Indian television series endings
Star One (Indian TV channel) original programming
2008 Indian television series debuts